The  were a class of three warships operated by the Imperial Japanese Navy. The vessels in the class were named after rivers according to the navy's light cruiser naming rule. They participated in numerous actions during the Pacific War and were mainly used as destroyer flotilla leaders.

Design
The Sendai-class light cruisers were a development of the preceding . Their boilers were better located, and they had four funnels instead of three. Each ship was designed with a flying-off platform and hangar, but did not actually carry aircraft until a catapult system was installed in 1929.

Ships in class
Eight additional 5,500-ton cruisers were planned to be built under the Eight-eight fleet Program. Four Sendai-class light cruisers were authorised to be constructed in Japan in 1921 and were laid down, but the last — Kako — was scrapped on the slipway in accordance with the regulations of the 1922 Washington Naval Treaty. The other three were sunk during World War II. Another four units were authorised to be built to the same design in 1922, but were cancelled following the signing of the Treaty after Japan decided that future cruiser construction would focus on heavy cruisers (the heavy cruisers Furutaka and Kako were built in place of two of the five cancelled Sendai Class cruisers).

References

Books

Model Art Ship Modelling Special No.29, 5,500 tons class cruisers, Model Art Co. Ltd. (Japan), September 2008, Book code 12319-09
, History of Pacific War Vol.32 Light cruiser Kuma/Nagara/Sendai classes, Gakken (Japan), August 2001, 
Daiji Katagiri, Ship Name Chronicles of the Imperial Japanese Navy Combined Fleet, Kōjinsha (Japan), June 1988, 
The Maru Special, Japanese Naval Vessels No.27 Sendai class cruisers, Ushio Shobō (Japan), May 1979, Book code 68343-27

External links

 CombinedFleet.com: Sendai class
 CombinedFleet.com: Sendai history

Cruiser classes
 
World War II cruisers of Japan